The Vibras Tour was the third headlining concert tour by Colombian singer J Balvin to promote his fifth studio album, Vibras (2018). The tour began on May 26, 2018 in Mexico City, and concluded on November 24, 2018 in Buenos Aires.

Set list
This set list is representative of the first concert of the tour, on July 28, 2018. It does not represent all concerts for the duration of the tour.

"Vibras"
"Mi Gente"
"Machika"
"Safari"
"Otra Vez"
"Downtown"
"Sorry (Latino Remix)"
"Ahora"
"Bonita"
"Ambiente"
"No Es Justo"
"Mi Cama (Remix)"
"Quiero Repetir"
"Bum Bum Tam Tam"
"Soy Peor (Remix)"
"Ahora Dice"
"Si Tu Novio Te Deja Sola"
"Sensualidad"
"Ay Vamos"
"6 AM"
"Peligrosa"
"Brillo"
"Sigo Extrañándote"
"X"
"Ginza"

Shows

Cancelled shows

Notes

References 

2018 concert tours
Concert tours of North America
Concert tours of Europe
Concert tours of Asia
Concert tours of South America